The 1998 Benson & Hedges Cup was the twenty-seventh edition of cricket's Benson & Hedges Cup. It was an English limited overs county cricket tournament which was held between 28 April and 12 July 1998.

It had been agreed at various meetings of the ECB in September 1997 that, due to restrictions on tobacco advertising and a desire to reduce the amount of one-day cricket played, that this would be the final Benson & Hedges Cup, but that henceforth a Super Cup would be played for between the top eight teams in the previous year's County Championship. The editor of Wisden, Matthew Engel, had suggested such a move in the 1995 edition in order to liven up the county scene.

The Super Cup was competed for in 1999 but was abandoned and the zonal system resumed for the 2000 competition. The revision to the system meant that 1998 was the last appearance in the Benson & Hedges Cup of the Minor Counties, the British Universities, Scotland and Ireland.

The competition was won by Essex County Cricket Club for the second time, defeating Leicestershire County Cricket Club by 192 runs in the final at Lord's on 11 and 12 July 1998.

Fixtures and results

Group stage

Group A

Source:

Group B

Source:

Group C

Source:

Group D

Source:

Quarter-finals

Semi-finals

Final

References

See also
Benson & Hedges Cup

Benson & Hedges Cup seasons
1998 in English cricket